The Blue Beach Resort is a luxury beach resort hotel that opened in Gaza in the summer of 2015.

The hotel features cabana boys serving clients on its private beach, and an Olympic-size swimming pool.   Guests stay in 162 "chalet-style" rooms set in landscaped grounds with views of the Mediterranean.  It is part of the entertainment district along Al-Rashid Street in Gaza City that features "dozens of new and modern resorts, chalets and coffee shops," other neighborhoods also have upscale shopping malls, apartment buildings, and entertainment venues.

Blue Beach joins the 5-star hotel, Mashtal, built in 2011, at the high end of the Gaza luxury hotel market.

The Washington Post describes the hotel as one of a number of luxury businesses catering to wealthy Gazans.  According to economic analyst Nizar Sha’ban, “Most foreigners who visit the Strip and stay in its hotels are journalists, aid workers, UN and Red Cross staff."

See also
 Tourism in the Palestinian territories

References

Hotels in Gaza City
Hotels established in 2015
Hotel buildings completed in 2015